A Measure of Vision is a live album by the Alvin Fielder Trio, led by drummer Fielder, and featuring trumpeter Dennis González and pianist Chris Parker. It was recorded in 2005 and 2006 in Texas, and was released in 2007 by Clean Feed Records. González's sons Aaron (bass) and Stefan (vibes and drums) also appear on several tracks. Despite the fact that Fielder was active as a musician since the mid 1960s, the album was his first and only release as a leader. (He died in 2019.)

Reception

In a review for AllMusic, Scott Yanow wrote: "The music on A Measure of Vision, even at its freest, is somewhat mellow and lyrical. Dennis Gonzalez displays a thoughtful style and a warm sound on trumpet... while pianist Chris Parker gives a modal feel to some of the songs... This set contains plenty of surprises along the way and is rewarded by repeat listenings. Recommended."

Troy Collins of All About Jazz stated: "Fielder and company share equally in the responsibility of keeping these mutable frameworks on track. Negotiating the spaces between them, the trio brings a casual aesthetic to their uncluttered conversations... An agreeable session full of open space, rich lyricism and adventurous improvisation, A Measure of Vision may have been a long time in coming, but some things are worth the wait."

A writer for The Free Jazz Collective commented: "these gentlemen know what music is: they quote freely from the jazz songbook, yet bring it at times to a high level of abstraction, blending genres... Fielder is strong, an economical drummer who accentuates with precision."

Track listing

 "Your Sons and Daughters Shall Prophesy" – 4:03
 "À Mon Frère" – 4:54
 "Camel" – 12:23
 "Max-Well" – 5:37
 "Ripe for Vision" – 15:57
 "Your Young Men Shall See Visions" – 6:52
 "Time No Time" – 4:55
 "Your Old Men Shall Dream Dreams" – 7:37
 "The Cecil Taylor – Sunny Murray Dancing Lesson" – 6:46

Personnel 
 Alvin Fielder – drums, percussion
 Dennis González – trumpet
 Chris Parker – piano
 Aaron González – bass (tracks 3, 5)
 Stefan González – drums (tracks 5, 6), vibes (track 5)

References

2007 live albums
Live free jazz albums
Clean Feed Records live albums